Antonio Garrido may refer to:

Antonio Garrido (golfer) (born 1944), Spanish golfer
Antonio Garrido (actor) (born 1971), Spanish actor and TV presenter
António Garrido (referee) (1932–2014), Portuguese football referee